is one of the eight titles in Japanese professional shogi.

The word literally means "king's seat", i.e., "throne". The tournament started in 1953 as a knockout tournament with three games in the final match and was a non-title tournament up until 1982. The challenger for the title is determined through three preliminary rounds. The player that wins three games out of five in the championship match becomes the new Ōza title holder.

The tournament is sponsored by Nikkei, Inc. (日本経済新聞社 nihon keizai shinbunsha), a newspaper conglomerate that publishes The Nikkei and the Nikkei 225 stock market index.

Lifetime Ōza 
 is the title given to a player who won the championship five times in a row or ten times in total. Active players may qualify for this title, but it is only officially awarded upon their retirement or death.

Lifetime Ōza title holders
 Makoto Nakahara (won championship ten times when it was a non-title tournament)
 Yoshiharu Habu

Winners 
From 1953 until 1982, the tournament was just regular tournament and not a major title match. From 1953 to 1969, two finalists would play a 3-game match to determine the overall winner; the 1st Oza match (1953), however, was only a single game. From 1970 to 1982, the winner of the previous year's tournament would play the winner of a qualifying tournament in a 3-game match.

For the 31st Oza Match (1983), the tournament was officially elevated to major title match status and starting with the 32nd Oza Match, the format switched to a best-of-five.

Records
 Most titles overall: Yoshiharu Habu, 24
 Most consecutive titles: Yoshiharu Habu, 19 in a row (1992-2010)

See also 
Oza (Go)

References

External links
61st Oza Match Official Site  by the Nihon Keizai Shimbun and the Japanese Shogi Association 
Shogi Kingdom  by Nihon Keizai Shimbun

 
Shogi tournaments